Lieutenant-General Frederick Vavasour Broome Witts  (30 January 1889 – 1969) was a senior British Army officer.

Military career
Educated at Radley College, Witts, the son of a clergyman, was commissioned into the Royal Engineers after graduating from the Royal Military Academy, Woolwich, on 23 July 1907. He served in the First World War and was awarded the Military Cross, as well as the Distinguished Service Order (DSO), and was mentioned in dispatches three times during the war. The citation for his MC reads:

Witts attended the Staff College, Quetta, from 1922−1923 and served at the War Office in London for the next four years. After serving on the directing staff at the Staff College, Camberley, from 1930−1932, Witts became Commander Royal Engineers for the 5th Infantry Division in 1933, Brigadier on the general staff of Western Command in India in December 1937 and commander of the 8th Indian Brigade in India in May 1938.

In the Second World War he served as General Officer Commanding 45th Infantry Division from September 1939, Deputy Chief of Staff for the British Expeditionary Force  (BEF) in France from April 1940 and General Officer Commanding 59th (Staffordshire) Infantry Division from May 1940. After that he became General Officer Commanding Bombay District in India from July 1941 and Acting General Officer Commanding Southern Command in India in 1942 before retiring in 1943.

References

Bibliography

External links
Generals of World War II

|-

1889 births
1969 deaths
British Army generals of World War II
Companions of the Order of the Bath
Commanders of the Order of the British Empire
Companions of the Distinguished Service Order
Recipients of the Military Cross
Royal Engineers officers
People educated at Radley College
British Army personnel of World War I
People from Gloucestershire
Graduates of the Royal Military Academy, Woolwich
British Army lieutenant generals
Academics of the Staff College, Camberley
Graduates of the Staff College, Quetta
Military personnel from Gloucestershire